Park Chan-wook (born 23 August 1963) is a South Korean film director, screenwriter, producer, and former film critic. He is considered one of the most prominent filmmakers of South Korean cinema as well as world cinema in 21st century. His films have gained notoriety for their cinematography and framing, black humor and often brutal subject matter.

Park's first major critical and commercial success came with Joint Security Area (2000) which was the most watched South Korean film at the time. This film helped him to secure more creative freedom and his next were Sympathy for Mr. Vengeance (2002) and Oldboy (2003) which received widespread critical acclaim worldwide and also won Grand Prix prize at Cannes Film Festival. Lady Vengeance (2005), another film in the unofficial The Vengeance Trilogy, also received critical acclaim.

His next psychological thriller The Handmaiden (2016) premiered in competition to rave reviews at the 2016 Cannes Film Festival, nominated for Palme d'Or and Queer Palm and won the Vulcain Prize for the Technical Arts, the film saw critical and commercial success in several countries, including South Korea, the United States and the United Kingdom. It also won the category of Best Film Not in the English Language. For Decision to Leave (2022), Park won Best Director at the 2022 Cannes Film Festival and  the film was selected to compete for the Palme d'Or.

He is also known for Thirst (2009) and  English-language works Stoker (2013) and The Little Drummer Girl (2018), a television miniseries based on the novel of the same name by John le Carré.

Early life
Park was born and raised in Seoul and studied philosophy at Sogang University, where, in light of his disappointment with the analytic orientation of the department and consequent scant offerings in aesthetics, he started a cinema club, the 'Sogang Film Community', and published a number of articles on contemporary cinema. Originally intending to be an art critic, Park, upon seeing Vertigo, resolved to become a filmmaker. After graduation, he wrote articles on film for journals and soon became an assistant director of films like Kkamdong, directed by Yu Yeong-jin, and Watercolor Painting in a Rainy Day, directed by Kwak Jae-yong (My Sassy Girl).

Career
Park's debut feature film was The Moon Is... the Sun's Dream (1992). After five years, he made his second film, Trio. Park's early films were not successful at the box office, and he pursued a career as a film critic to make a living. In an interview in 2017, he said "Many people know my directorial debut film is JSA, but I want to keep it that way".

In 2000, Park directed Joint Security Area, which was a great success both commercially and critically, even surpassing Kang Je-gyu's Shiri as the then most-watched film ever made in South Korea. This success made it possible for Park to make his next film more independently. Sympathy for Mr. Vengeance is the result of this creative freedom.

Park's unofficially-titled Vengeance Trilogy consists of Sympathy for Mr. Vengeance (2002), Oldboy (2003) and Lady Vengeance (2005). It was not originally intended to be a trilogy. Park won the Grand Prix at the 2004 Cannes Film Festival for Oldboy. The films concern the utter futility of vengeance and how it wreaks havoc on the lives of those involved. Lady Vengeance was distributed by Tartan Films for the United States theatrical release in April 2006. American director Quentin Tarantino is an avowed fan of Park. As the head judge at the 2004 Cannes Film Festival, he personally pushed for Park's Oldboy to be awarded the Palme d'Or (the honour eventually went to Michael Moore's Fahrenheit 9/11). Oldboy garnered the Grand Prix, Cannes's second-highest honour. Tarantino also regards Park's Joint Security Area to be one of "the top twenty films made since 1992."

In a May 2004 interview with The Hollywood Reporter, Park listed Sophocles, Shakespeare, Kafka, Dostoevsky, Balzac and Kurt Vonnegut as influences on his career.

Since 2004, Park has been an owner of the filmmaking company Moho Film, which participated in the production of Snowpiercer (2013) and The Handmaiden (2016).

In 2006, Park was the member of official section jury at the 63rd Venice International Film Festival.

In February 2007, Park won the Alfred Bauer Prize at the 57th Berlin International Film Festival. The award, named after the festival's founder and in praise of works that introduce new perspectives, went to Park for his film, I'm a Cyborg, But That's OK.

In 2009, Park directed the vampire film Thirst, starring Song Kang-ho, which won the Prix du Jury (alongside Fish Tank, directed by Andrea Arnold) at the 2009 Cannes Film Festival. He considered directing Tinker Tailor Soldier Spy but ultimately turned it down.

In 2011, Park said his new fantasy-horror film Paranmanjang (Night Fishing) was shot entirely on the iPhone. The film was co-directed with Park's younger brother, Park Chan-kyong, who had no prior directing experience. It was nominated for Berlinale Shorts during the 2011 Berlin Film Festival and won the Golden Bear for Best Short Film.

In 2013, Park directed his first English-language film, Stoker. He said he learned to accelerate the production process and completed filming in 480 hours. Although Park does speak English, he used an interpreter on set. On why the script attracted his attention, Park said: "It wasn't a script that tried to explain everything and left many things as questions, so it leads the audience to find answers for themselves, and that's what I liked about the script... I like telling big stories through small, artificially created worlds". On 2 March 2013, Park appeared on a panel discussion about the film Stoker held at the Freer Gallery of Art in the Smithsonian's Museums of Asian Art.

In 2014, Park directed a short film commissioned by luxury brand Ermenegildo Zegna, co-written by himself, Ayako Fujitani, Chung Chung-hoon and Michael Werwie, scored by Clint Mansell, and starring Jack Huston and Daniel Wu. It screened at the Rome International Film Festival and the Busan International Film Festival.

In September 2014, it was announced that Park would adapt Fingersmith, a historical crime novel by Sarah Waters. The film entered production in mid-2015 and ended on 31 October 2015. That film ended up becoming The Handmaiden and premiered in competition to rave reviews at the 2016 Cannes Film Festival, where Artistic Director Seong-hie Ryu won the Vulcain Prize for the Technical Arts, and the film was nominated for both the Palme d' Or and Queer Palm. At the 2016 Buil Film Awards, The Handmaiden won for Best New Actress (Tae-ri Kim), The Buil Readers' Jury Award and Best Art Direction (Seong-hie Ryu). The film holds a 95% rating on Rotten Tomatoes, and saw box office success in several countries, including South Korea, the United States and the United Kingdom.

In October 2014, it was announced that Park had signed on to direct the sci-fi body-swap film, Second Born.

In January 2018, it was stated that Park would direct a TV miniseries adaptation of The Little Drummer Girl, a novel by John le Carré. It aired on BBC One in October of that year and stars Michael Shannon, Florence Pugh and Alexander Skarsgård.

At the 24th Busan International Film Festival, Park said that he is writing scripts for feature films, for theater and for TV, including a new installment in the Vengeance Trilogy, and a second adaptation of Donald E. Westlake's novel The Axe.

In May 2020, it was announced that he was working on his next film's screenplay, tentatively titled Heeojil gyeolsim (The Decision to Break Up). It is described as a melodrama and will star Tang Wei and Park Hae-il. In October 2020, the title of the film was revealed as Decision to Leave, with the story described as a murder mystery romance. The film was set to begin shooting later that month. In April 2021, A24 optioned Viet Thanh Nguyen's 2015 novel The Sympathizer for a TV adaptation, with Park Chan-wook directing. He was awarded Best Director at the 2022 Cannes Film Festival for his work on Decision to Leave.

Personal life
Park was raised in a devout Catholic family in Korea, and describes himself as an atheist. He has collaborated with his younger brother, Park Chan-kyong, who is a media artist. He dedicated his career tribute to his wife Kim Eun-Hee at the 15th Marrakech International Film Festival.
He voiced support for the Democratic Labor Party and was also a member of its successor, the New Progressive Party. He supported Justice Party candidate Sim Sang-jung in the 2017 South Korean presidential election.

Filmography
Source: Korean Movie Database

Feature films

Television

Short films

Bibliography
 2005. Park's Montage (박찬욱의 몽타주). 마음 산책. 299 pages. .
 2005. Park's Hommage (박찬욱의 오마주). 마음 산책. 528 pages. .

Awards and nominations

State honors

See also
 List of Korean-language films
 Cinema of South Korea
 Contemporary culture of South Korea

Notes

References

External links

 
 
 
 
 Park Chan-Wook to make korean horror Movie using only iPhone at Korean Horror Movies
 Park Chan-wook: monographic website (Italian & English)
 Cineseoul profile (Korean)
 HanCinema Director Page
 Park Chan-wook at FEARnet
 SuicideGirls interview with Park Chan-wook by Daniel Robert Epstein
 July 2009 Interview with Park Chan-wook at the Korea Society (Audio)
 Park Chan-wook on Naver

South Korean atheists
South Korean film producers
South Korean film directors
South Korean screenwriters
South Korean film critics
People from Seoul
1963 births
Living people
Sogang University alumni
Horror film directors
Filmmakers who won the Best Foreign Language Film BAFTA Award
Cannes Film Festival Award for Best Director winners
Best Director Paeksang Arts Award (film) winners
Grand Prize Paeksang Arts Award (Film) winners